TIA or Tia may refer to:

Aviation 
 Tampa International Airport, US, IATA code TPA
 Texas International Airlines, US, ICAO code
 Tirana International Airport Nënë Tereza, Albania, IATA code
 Trans International Airlines, former U.S. airline company
 Tribhuvan International Airport (IATA code: KTM), Kathmandu, Nepal
 Trivandrum International Airport (IATA code: TRV), Thiruvananthapuram, Kerala, India
 Tucson International Airport (IATA code: TUS), Arizona, US

Business and government 
 Tía, a South American supermarket chain based in Ecuador
 Telecommunications Industry Association, US
 Total Information Awareness or Terrorism Information Awareness Program, US
 Transparency in Armaments, UN initiative
 Trust Indenture Act of 1939, US

Geography 
 Tia, Burkina Faso, a village in the Siglé Department of Boulkiemdé Province
 Tia, New South Wales, a settlement and parish in Australia
 Tia, Fiji, a village of Motusa in Fiji
 Tia-ye Olya, a village in Iran
 Tia-ye Sofla, a village in Iran
 Tia, Leh, a village in India

Literature and arts 
 Tia and Megumi Oumi, characters in the anime and manga series Zatch Bell!
 The Intellectual Activist, American monthly Objectivist magazine
 Tia, a character in the French TV series Galactik Football
 "T.I.A.", a song by K'naan in the album Troubadour
 Tournament Indoor Association, a division of Tournament of Bands, US
 Tia, a Diva Starz doll
 T.I.A., a secret spy agency from Spanish comic series Mort & Phil

People 
 TiA (born 1987), female Japanese singer
 Tia (singer), female Japanese singer
 Tia (Maori explorer), early Māori explorer and chief
 Tia (princess) an ancient Egyptian princess during the 19th dynasty
 Tia (overseer of treasury), ancient Egyptian official, husband of Princess Tia
 Tia (name), people with the given name or surname

Technology 
 Transimpedance amplifier, a type of current-to-voltage converter
 Television Interface Adaptor, custom chip that is the heart of the Atari 2600 game console
 The Internet Adapter, 1993 software created by Cyberspace Development

Other uses
 Tia (goddess), a goddess in the Haida religion
 Tia (moth), a genus of moths in the family Tortricidae
 Transient ischemic attack, a "mini-stroke"